The 2018 Professional Golf Tour of India was the 12th season of the Professional Golf Tour of India.

Schedule
The following table lists official events during the 2018 season.

Order of Merit
The Order of Merit was based on prize money won during the season, calculated in Indian rupees.

Notes

References

Professional Golf Tour of India
Professional Golf Tour of India